Silver Lining, A Silver Lining or The Silver Lining may refer to:

 Silver lining (idiom), a metaphor for optimism in the common English-language idiom "Every cloud has a silver lining"

Film 
 The Silver Lining (1915 film), a short directed by B. Reeves Eason
 The Silver Lining (1919 film), a British silent sports film
 The Silver Lining (1921 film), a silent drama directed by Roland West
 The Silver Lining (1927 film), a British silent drama directed by Thomas Bentley
 The Silver Lining (1932 film), a film starring Maureen O'Sullivan

Music

Albums 
 Silver Lining (album), by Bonnie Raitt, 2002
 A Silver Lining, by We Shot the Moon, 2009
 The Silver Lining (Earshot album), 2008
 The Silver Lining (Soul Asylum album), 2006
 The Silver Lining: The Songs of Jerome Kern, by Tony Bennett and Bill Charlap, 2015
 Silver Lining, by Jake Miller, 2018
 Silver Lining, by Nils Lofgren, 1991
 Silver Linings, by Milow, 2014

Songs 
 "Silver Lining (Crazy 'Bout You)", by Jessie J from the film Silver Linings Playbook, 2012
 "(Fuck A) Silver Lining", by Panic! at the Disco, 2018
 "Silver Lining", by Ace of Hearts, a band formed by Alpharad, 2020
 "Silver Lining", by Beulah from The Coast Is Never Clear
 "Silver Lining", by David Gray from White Ladder
 "Silver Lining", by Gang of Four from Hard
 "Silver Lining", by Garfunkel and Oates
 "Silver Lining", by Hunter Brothers from State of Mind
 "Silver Lining", by Hurts from Happiness
 "Silver Lining", by Kacey Musgraves from Same Trailer Different Park
 "Silver Lining", by Lee DeWyze from Frames
 "Silver Lining", by Mt. Joy
 "Silver Lining", by Nadia Ali from Embers
 "Silver Lining", by Neck Deep from Rain in July
 "Silver Lining", by Polly Scattergood from Arrows
 "Silver Lining", by Rilo Kiley from Under the Blacklight
 "Silver Lining", by Stiff Little Fingers from Go for It
 "Silver Lining (Clap Your Hands)", by Imany, 2016
 "Silver Linings", by Frank Fischer from Café del Mar

Television 
 Silver Lining (audio drama), a Bernice Summerfield story based on Doctor Who
 The Silver Lining (TV series), a 1997 Singaporean Chinese drama series
 Silver Lining (TV series), a 2010 Singaporean series starring Richard Ng
 "Silver Lining" (The Jeffersons), an episode
 "Silver Lining" (Law & Order: Criminal Intent), an episode

Other uses 
 Silver Lining (play), a play by Sandi Toksvig
 The Silver Lining (video game), a 2010 fan-created game based on Sierra's King's Quest series
 Silver Lining Foundation a Chinese non-profit organization for orphans and cerebral palsy victims
 Silver Lining Productions, a former UK-based animation studio and licensing firm, later a subsidiary of Chorion
 Silver Lining (horse), a Thoroughbred racehorse, three-time Hong Kong Horse of the Year
 Silver Lining, a gardening book by Karen Platt
 The Silver Lining, a 1949—1964 BBC radio programme presented by Stuart Hibberd

See also
 My Silver Lining (disambiguation)
 Silver Line (disambiguation)
 Silver Linings Playbook
 Silver Lining Suite, an album by Hiromi Uehara
 "The Lining Is Silver", a song by Relient K from The Nashville Tennis EP, released with The Bird and the Bee Sides